Edinburgh Northern and Leith is a constituency of the Scottish Parliament (Holyrood) covering part of the council area of Edinburgh. It elects one Member of the Scottish Parliament (MSP) by the plurality (first past the post) method of election. It is one of nine constituencies in the Lothian electoral region, which elects seven additional members, in addition to the nine constituency MSPs, to produce a form of proportional representation for the region as a whole.

Prior to the 2011 Scottish Parliament election, most of the constituency was part of the Edinburgh North and Leith constituency.

The seat has been held by Ben Macpherson of the Scottish National Party since the 2016 Scottish Parliament election.

Electoral region

The other eight constituencies of the Lothian region are Almond Valley, Edinburgh Central, Edinburgh Eastern, Edinburgh Pentlands, Edinburgh Southern, Edinburgh Western, Linlithgow and Midlothian North and Musselburgh.

The region includes all of the City of Edinburgh council area, parts of the East Lothian council area, parts of the Midlothian council area and all of the West Lothian council area.

Constituency boundaries and council area

Edinburgh is represented in the Scottish Parliament by six constituencies: Edinburgh Central, Edinburgh Eastern, Edinburgh Northern and Leith, Edinburgh Pentlands, Edinburgh Southern and Edinburgh Western.

The Edinburgh North and Leith constituency was created at the same time as the Scottish Parliament, in 1999, with the name and boundaries of an existing Westminster constituency. In 2005, however, Scottish House of Commons constituencies were mostly replaced with new constituencies.

Since 2011, "Edinburgh Northern and Leith" has consisted of the electoral wards of:
In full: Leith Walk
In part: Forth, Inverleith, Leith

Member of the Scottish Parliament

Election results

2020s

2010s

See also
 Politics of Edinburgh

Footnotes

External links

Northern and Leith (Scottish Parliament constituency)
Constituencies of the Scottish Parliament
2011 establishments in Scotland
Constituencies established in 2011
Scottish Parliament constituencies and regions from 2011
Leith